is a railway station in Saku, Nagano, Japan, operated by the East Japan Railway Company (JR East).

Lines
On the Shinkansen line, it is located 164.4 kilometers from Tokyo Station. It is also a stop on the local service Koumi Line and is located 71.5 kilometers from the starting point of that line at Kobuchizawa Station.

Station layout
The station has two opposed side platforms serving two tracks of the Hokuriku Shinkansen, with an elevated station building. There is also a single elevated unnumbered side platform served by the single bidirectional track of the Koumi Line, which cuts diagonally above the Shinkansen platforms, and which is connected to the station building by a passageway. The station has a Midori no Madoguchi staffed ticket office.

Platforms

History
The station opened on October 1, 1997, coinciding with the opening of the Nagano Shinkansen.

Passenger statistics
In fiscal 2015, the station was used by an average of 2,937 passengers daily (boarding passengers only).

Surrounding area

 Saku Chosei Junior & Senior High School

See also
List of railway stations in Japan

References

External links

JR East Sakudaira Station

Railway stations in Nagano Prefecture
Stations of East Japan Railway Company
Hokuriku Shinkansen
Koumi Line
Railway stations in Japan opened in 1997
Saku, Nagano